Aubrey Smith, born 30 June 1988, in Kingston, Jamaica is a track and field athlete, specialising in the long jump. He represented Canada at the 2015 Summer Universiade and Jamaica at the 2016 Summer Olympics.

Smith graduated at Florida International University, in Miami, Florida, USA. He also won the silver medal, in the long jump, at the 2014 Conference USA Outdoor Track & Field Championships, while representing FIU. It was there he attained the school record, on his opening jump, of 7.80m (25 feet 7 ¼ inches).

Competition record

References

1988 births
Living people
Canadian male long jumpers
Jamaican male long jumpers
Jamaican emigrants to Canada
Black Canadian track and field athletes
Sportspeople from Kingston, Jamaica
Athletes from Toronto
Athletes (track and field) at the 2016 Summer Olympics
Olympic athletes of Jamaica
Competitors at the 2015 Summer Universiade